Boyd station is a flag stop railway station in Boyd, Manitoba, Canada.  The stop is served by Via Rail's Winnipeg – Churchill train.

Footnotes

External links 
Via Rail Station Information

Via Rail stations in Manitoba